Harri Garmendia (born 18 June 1966) is a Spanish former butterfly and medley swimmer who competed in the 1984 Summer Olympics.

References

1966 births
Living people
Spanish male medley swimmers
Spanish male butterfly swimmers
Olympic swimmers of Spain
Swimmers at the 1984 Summer Olympics
People from Beasain
Mediterranean Games gold medalists for Spain
Mediterranean Games medalists in swimming
Swimmers at the 1983 Mediterranean Games
Sportspeople from Gipuzkoa
Swimmers from the Basque Country (autonomous community)